Highway 148 (AR 148, Ark. 148, and Hwy. 148) is a designation for three east–west state highways in the Upper Arkansas Delta. One route of  begins at Highway 239 and runs east to a Mississippi River levee. A second route of  begins at Highway 181 and runs east to US Highway 61 (US 61) in Burdette. A third route of  begins at Highway 135 in Black Oak and runs east to Highway 139. All routes are maintained by the Arkansas State Highway and Transportation Department (AHTD).

Route description

Highway 239 to Mississippi River
AR 148 begins at the southern terminus of AR 239, heads east past the southern terminus of AR 151 and ends at a Mississippi River levee.

Highway 181 to Burdette
It begins heading east from an intersection with AR 181 through very rural farmlands until it enters Burdette town limits as it interchanges with I-55's Exit 57. After winding through some curves in downtown Burdette, it ends at an unsignalized intersection with US 61.

Black Oak to Highway 139
The highway begins at Highway 135 (Main St) in Black Oak south of downtown. Highway 148 runs due east as a section line road to Highway 139 in eastern Craighead County near the Mississippi County line.

Major junctions

See also

 List of state highways in Arkansas

References

External links

148
Transportation in Mississippi County, Arkansas
Transportation in Craighead County, Arkansas